Contortipalpia masculina is a moth in the family Crambidae. It was described by Eugene G. Munroe in 1964. It is found in Brazil.

References

Glaphyriinae
Moths described in 1964